Agyneta mollis is a species of sheet weaver found in the Palearctic. It was described by O.P.-Cambridge in 1871.

References

mollis
Spiders of Europe
Palearctic spiders
Spiders described in 1871